Interstate 475 (I-475) is a  auxiliary Interstate Highway in Georgia, splitting off from I-75/State Route 540 (SR 540) and bypassing Macon. It is also unsigned State Route 408 (SR 408). This is the preferred route for through traffic, as I-75 enters Downtown Macon and reduces to four lanes (two in either direction; undergoing widening), and has a  speed limit, in addition to the highway interchange with I-16.

Route description

I-475 carries six lanes (three in each direction) throughout its entire route (expanding to eight lanes at both junctions with I-75), except at its northernmost terminus with I-75, where it briefly reduces to four lanes. 

The entire length of I-475 is part of the National Highway System, a system of routes determined to be the most important for the nation's economy, mobility, and defense.

History
Built in stages between 1965 and 1967, I-475 was originally built with two lanes in each direction, and a wide median with forest, mostly of sweetgum trees. When the one lane was added in each direction, every bit of the median was paved, with a full-lane-wide shoulder in both directions instead of the normal very narrow ones, and a Jersey barrier designed to prevent head-on collisions, instead of leaving, replanting any trees, other landscaping or native vegetation.

In 1965, the entire length of the highway was under construction; it opened two years later. At the time, I-75 going into Macon was not yet complete. 

The Bibb County Commission named the highway in honor of former Commission Chair Larry Justice, who retired in 2000.

Exit list

See also

References

External links

 Kurumi - Georgia I-475

75-4 Georgia
75-4
Transportation in Macon, Georgia
4 Georgia
Transportation in Bibb County, Georgia
Transportation in Monroe County, Georgia